Troco Likes is the fourth studio album by Brazilian singer-songwriter Tiago Iorc. It was released on July 10, 2015. The album was produced by Tiago Iorc and Alexandre Castilho. Its lead single, "Coisa Linda", was released on June 1, 2015.

Troco Likes won Best Portuguese Language Contemporary Pop Album at the 17th Latin Grammy Awards.

Track listing

References

2015 albums
Portuguese-language albums
Tiago Iorc albums